Patrick Phillips is an American poet, writer, and professor. He teaches writing and literature at Stanford University, and is a Carnegie Foundation Fellow and a fellow of the Cullman Center for Writers at the New York Public Library. He has been a Fulbright Scholar at the University of Copenhagen, and previously taught writing and literature at Drew University. He grew up in Georgia and now lives in San Francisco.

Works
Phillips' 2015 poetry collection, Elegy for a Broken Machine (Alfred A. Knopf), was a finalist for the National Book Award for Poetry. His poems have appeared in many magazines, including Poetry, Ploughshares, The American Poetry Review, Harvard Review, DoubleTake, New England Review, and Virginia Quarterly Review, and have been featured on Garrison Keillor's show The Writer's Almanac on National Public Radio.

Phillips' 2016 non-fiction book Blood at the Root: A Racial Cleansing in America was named a best book of the year by The Boston Globe, The New York Times, and Smithsonian magazine.

Phillips has also served as a faculty member for the annual Conference on Poetry at The Frost Place in New Hampshire.

Honors and awards
 2010 Guggenheim Fellowship
 2009 National Endowment for the Arts Fellowship in Poetry
 2008 Translation Prize of the American-Scandinavian Foundation
 2005 Kate Tufts Discovery Award, for Chattahoochee
 2004 Bread Loaf Writers' Conference Fellowship
 2003 "Discovery" / The Nation Award, Unterberg Poetry Center of the 92nd Street Y
 2001 Sjoberg Translation Prize of the American-Scandinavian Foundation, for translations of the Danish poet Henrik Nordbrandt
 2000 Fulbright Fellowship in Literary Translation, University of Copenhagen

Published works

References

External links
 Official Website - PatrickPhillipsBooks.com
 "Stray Questions for: Patrick Phillips", Gregory Cowles, The New York Times, October 24, 2008
 "Watching the Surface for a Sign", video of readings and an interview with Natasha Trethewey, Southern Spaces: An Interndisciplinary Journal about the regions, places, and cultures of the American South, Emory University, April 14, 2009
 From the Fishouse: An Audio Archive of Emerging Poets: Patrick Phillips
 American Life in Poetry, Selected and Introduced by Ted Kooser: "Matinee" by Patrick Phillips

Living people
Year of birth missing (living people)
American male poets
University of Copenhagen alumni
National Endowment for the Arts Fellows
Poets from Georgia (U.S. state)
Writers from Georgia (U.S. state)
Drew University faculty
Stanford University faculty
American translators
MacDowell Colony fellows
American Book Award winners
Fulbright alumni